Datuk Seri Windsor John (born 1961) is a Malaysian football administrator.

In 2015, he was appointed as the Asian Football Confederation's Secretary General. He replaced Alex Soosay, former Secretary General who has been suspended by the AFC.

References 

1961 births
Living people

Malaysian sports executives and administrators
Asian Football Confederation executives
Association football executives